Espínola is Spanish surname, which may refer to:

 Arnaldo Espínola, Paraguayan footballer
 Carlos Espínola (sailor), Argentine windsurfer and politician
 Carlos González Espínola, Paraguayan footballer
 Darío Espínola, Argentine footballer
 Ernesto Espinola, Paraguayan chess player
 Juan Espínola (footballer), Paraguayan footballer
 Lourdes Espinola, Paraguayan poet, diplomat, cultural promoter
 María Espínola, Argentine windsurfer
 Néstor Espínola, Argentine footballer
 Víctor Espínola, Paraguayan multi-instrumentalist and singer

Spanish-language surnames